Brice Vivien Batchaya Ketchanke (born August 16, 1985) is a Cameroonian weightlifter. Batchaya represented Cameroon at the 2008 Summer Olympics in Beijing, where he competed for the men's light heavyweight class (85 kg). Batchaya placed fourteenth in this event, as he successfully lifted 153 kg in the single-motion snatch, and hoisted 180 kg in the two-part, shoulder-to-overhead clean and jerk, for a total of 333 kg.

References

External links
NBC Olympics Profile

Cameroonian male weightlifters
1985 births
Living people
Olympic weightlifters of Cameroon
Weightlifters at the 2008 Summer Olympics
Commonwealth Games medallists in weightlifting
Commonwealth Games silver medallists for Cameroon
Weightlifters at the 2006 Commonwealth Games
African Games bronze medalists for Cameroon
African Games medalists in weightlifting
Competitors at the 2007 All-Africa Games
21st-century Cameroonian people
Medallists at the 2006 Commonwealth Games